The Sweet Hereafter may refer to:

 The Sweet Hereafter (novel), a 1991 novel by Russell Banks
 The Sweet Hereafter (film), a 1997 Canadian film written and directed by Atom Egoyan, an adaptation of the novel
 The Sweet Hereafter (soundtrack), 1997 music album to the film
 1998 Series 7 episode of British TV series 2point4 children
 "Chapter Thirteen: The Sweet Hereafter", the season one finale of the 2017 live-action American television series, Riverdale.